Heber Williams Viera da Silva (born April 29, 1979 in Salto) is a Uruguayan sprinter who has been prominent in South American sprints since the turn of the century. He competed at the Summer Olympics in 2000, 2004 and 2008, being knocked out in the heats each time.

Viera represented Uruguay at the 2008 Summer Olympics in Beijing. He competed at the 200 metres and placed sixth in his first round heat in a time of 20.93 seconds, which was not enough to advance to the second round.

Competition record

Personal bests
100 metres - 10.08 (2002)
200 metres - 20.46 (2002)

References

External links
 
 Profile

1979 births
Living people
Athletes (track and field) at the 2000 Summer Olympics
Athletes (track and field) at the 2004 Summer Olympics
Athletes (track and field) at the 2008 Summer Olympics
Athletes (track and field) at the 1999 Pan American Games
Athletes (track and field) at the 2003 Pan American Games
Athletes (track and field) at the 2007 Pan American Games
Olympic athletes of Uruguay
Sportspeople from Salto, Uruguay
Uruguayan male sprinters
Pan American Games competitors for Uruguay
South American Games silver medalists for Uruguay
South American Games medalists in athletics
Competitors at the 1998 South American Games
20th-century Uruguayan people
21st-century Uruguayan people